Jane's U.S. Navy Fighters '97 (USNF '97) is a 1996 combat flight simulator video game developed by Electronic Arts. It's an updated version of the 1994 video game U.S. Navy Fighters.

Gameplay
The game contains three campaigns: Vietnam War-era, a fictional Russian-Ukrainian war, and a fictional Russian-Japanese conflict over the Kuril Islands. It is an expansion on the original MS-DOS 1994 version of US Navy Fighters with added planes, music, and two new campaigns.

Reception

References

External links 

1996 video games
Combat flight simulators
Jane's Combat Simulations
Electronic Arts games
Multiplayer and single-player video games
North America-exclusive video games
Video games scored by George Sanger
Video games with historical settings
Windows games
Windows-only games
Video games developed in the United States